Jean-Pierre Kurth was born on February 20, 1957, in Porrentruy, canton of Jura and resides in Verbier, canton of Valais. He is a handisport skier. He represented Switzerland at the 1984 Winter Paralympics, where he competed in alpine skiing.

He won several gold medals with Guy Dériaz as guide at the 1982 Winter sport world championship in the Alpes vaudoises, including the gold medal in the Giant Slalom B2, the Downhill B2, and the Combined B2. (B2 is the category for the visually impaired).

In 1984, he competed at the Winter Paralympics in Innsbruck with Guy Dériaz as guide. He won the bronze medal in the Giant Slalom B2 event.

See also 
 List of Paralympic medalists in alpine skiing

References 

Living people
Year of birth missing (living people)
Place of birth missing (living people)
Paralympic alpine skiers of Switzerland
Alpine skiers at the 1984 Winter Paralympics
Medalists at the 1984 Winter Paralympics
Paralympic bronze medalists for Switzerland
Paralympic medalists in alpine skiing
Sportspeople from the canton of Jura